Vitali Petrovich Tasenko (born 30 January 1975 in Rostov-on-Don) is a former Russian football player.

External links
 

1975 births
Living people
Sportspeople from Rostov-on-Don
Russian footballers
FC SKA Rostov-on-Don players
PFC CSKA Moscow players
Russian Premier League players
FC Kuban Krasnodar players
FC Volgar Astrakhan players
Association football defenders
FC Amur Blagoveshchensk players